Žarko Odžakov (born 11 November 1955, in Skopje) is a retired footballer who represented Australia 13 times in full international matches. Former Australia coach Rale Rasic in 2006 picked Odžakov in his greatest Socceroo team.

Playing career

Club career

FK Vardar
Odžakov played 109 matches over eight years for FK Vardar in the Yugoslav First League, scoring nine goals.

Preston
In 1982, he emigrated to Australia where he played for Preston Makedonia in the National Soccer League.

Sydney Croatia
From 1985 until 1987 he played at NSL club Sydney Croatia. It was at Croatia that he took the notice of the Australian selectors.

Blacktown City
After two years at Croatia he moved to Blacktown City where he played two years, playing 55 NSL matches.

International career

Outdoor football
In 1985 Odžakov played his first international match for the Australia. In all he played 13 full international matches for the Socceroos, playing his last match in 1987.

Futsal
Odžakov played three matches for the Australia national futsal team at the 1989 FIFA Futsal World Championship.

Coaching career
Soon after retiring Odžakov returned to his native North Macedonia. He soon received his coaching accreditation in Belgrade.

After a string of assistant coaching roles Odžakov had stint managing FK Vardar, where he managed to place Vardar in the top half of the Macedonian First League.

Odžakov managed various North Macedonia youth teams, including the North Macedonia national under-21 football team.

Zarko Odzakov Cup
The Zarko Odzakov Cup is named in honour of Odžakov. It is contested by Sydney United (formerly Sydney Croatia) and Bankstown City (a team representing the Macedonian-Australian community).

References

External links
 

1955 births
Living people
Footballers from Skopje
Yugoslav emigrants to Australia
Association football midfielders
Yugoslav footballers
Macedonian footballers
Australian soccer players
Australia international soccer players
FK Vardar players
Preston Lions FC players
Sydney United 58 FC players
Blacktown City FC players
Yugoslav First League players
Yugoslav Second League players
National Soccer League (Australia) players
Yugoslav expatriate footballers
Macedonian expatriate footballers
Australian men's futsal players
Macedonian football managers
Australian soccer coaches
FK Vardar managers
North Macedonia national under-21 football team managers